Katrin Meinke (born 19 September 1979) is a German bicyclist. She competed in the women's sprint cycling, points race and track time trial at the 2004 Summer Olympics.

References

1979 births
Living people
Cyclists at the 2004 Summer Olympics
Place of birth missing (living people)
German female cyclists
Olympic cyclists of Germany
People from Wismar
Cyclists from Mecklenburg-Western Pomerania
People from Bezirk Rostock